Casey Manierka-Quaile, also known as Casey MQ, is a Canadian singer, musician, and writer. In 2022, he won the Canadian Screen Award for Best Original Song at the 10th Canadian Screen Awards for "And Then We Don't", a song he co-wrote with Tika Simone for Thyrone Tommy's film Learn to Swim.

Career 
MQ began making music sometime during the 2010s. Formerly associated with the band Unbuttoned, MQ released his solo debut album, titled babycasey, in 2020. In the same year, he was one of the creators of Club Quarantine, a popular Zoom-based online club night for LGBTQ audiences during the COVID-19 pandemic.

In 2021, MQ followed up with the remix album babycasey: ultra.

He has also been a member of the reunited lineup of 1980s New Wave band Spoons, and was one of the producers on Cadence Weapon's Polaris Music Prize-winning album Parallel World.

References

21st-century Canadian male musicians
Canadian pop musicians
Canadian electronic musicians
Canadian songwriters
Canadian gay musicians
Canadian record producers
Living people
Queer musicians
Year of birth missing (living people)
Best Original Song Genie and Canadian Screen Award winners
21st-century Canadian LGBT people